Coccothrinax pumila is a palm which is endemic to Cuba.

References

pumila
Trees of Cuba
Plants described in 1995